The German minority population in Russia, Ukraine, and the Soviet Union stemmed from several sources and arrived in several waves. Since the second half of the 19th century, as a consequence of the Russification policies and compulsory military service in the Russian Empire, large groups of Germans from Russia emigrated to the Americas (mainly Canada, the United States, Brazil and Argentina), where they founded many towns. In 1914, an estimate put the remaining number of ethnic Germans living in the Russian Empire at 2,416,290. While Stalin held power, ethnic German families were deported to gulag concentration camps located in Siberia and other parts of Central Asia, leading to the genocide of Germans from Russia. In 1989, the Soviet Union declared to have an ethnic German population of roughly 2 million. By 2002, following the collapse of the Soviet Union in 1991, many ethnic Germans had emigrated (mainly to Germany) and the population fell by half to roughly 1 million. 597,212 Germans self-identified as such in the 2002 Russian census, making Germans the fifth-largest ethnic group in the Russian Federation. There were 353,441 Germans in Kazakhstan and 21,472 in Kyrgyzstan (1999); while 33,300 Germans lived in Ukraine (2001 census).

Emigrants from Germany first arrived in Kievan Russia during the reign of Olga of Kiev. Before Catherine the Great's reign (1762–1796), ethnic Germans were also already strongly represented amongst royalty and aristocracy, as the European nobility was highly interrelated. In addition, Germans had become prominent among large land-owners, military officers, and the upper echelons of the imperial service, engineers, scientists, artists, physicians, and the bourgeoisie in general, because there was strong education among some of the German peoples. The Germans of Russia did not necessarily speak Russian; many spoke German, while French was often used as the language of the high aristocracy. Depending on geography and other circumstances, many Russian Germans spoke Russian as their first or second language. During the 19th century many of the early immigrants began to identify primarily as Russians, particularly during and after the Napoleonic Wars of 1803-1815. The large numbers of farmers and village tradesmen who arrived following Catherine the Great's invitation were allowed to settle in German-only villages and to keep their German language, religion, and culture until the 1920s. She was seeking to repopulate some areas devastated by Ottoman invasions and by disease. 

Today's Russian Germans speak mostly Russian, as they are in the gradual process of assimilation. As such, many may not necessarily be fluent in German. Consequently, Germany has recently strictly limited their re-patriation. A decline in the number of Germans in the Russian Federation has moderated as they are no longer emigrating to Germany. In addition, Kazakhstan Germans from Kazakhstan are moving to Russia rather than Germany. As conditions for Germans in Russia generally deteriorated in the late 19th-century and early 20th-century during the period of unrest and revolution, many ethnic Germans migrated from Russia to the Americas and elsewhere. They became collectively known as Germans from Russia.

Germans in Imperial Russia (partitioned Poland and Caucasus)

German merchants established a trading post at Novgorod, which they called Peterhof. In 1229, German merchants at Novgorod were granted certain privileges that made their positions more secure.

The earliest German settlement in Moscow dates to the reign of Vasili III, Grand Prince of Moscow, from 1505 to 1533. A handful of German and Dutch craftsmen and traders were allowed to settle in Moscow's German Quarter (Немецкая слобода, or Nemetskaya sloboda), as they provided essential technical skills in the capital. Gradually, this policy extended to a few other major cities. In 1682, Moscow had about 200,000 citizens; some 18,000 were classified as Nemtsy, which means either "German" or "western foreigner".

The international community located in the German Quarter greatly influenced Peter the Great (reigned 1682-1725). His efforts to transform Russia into a more modern European state are believed to have derived in large part from his experiences among Russia's established Germans. By the late 17th-century, foreigners were no longer so rare in Russian cities, and Moscow's German Quarter had lost its ethnic character by the end of that century.

Vistula Germans (Poland)

Through wars and the partitions of Poland, Prussia acquired an increasing amount of northern, western, and central Polish territory. The Vistula River flows south to north, with its mouth on the Baltic Sea near Danzig (now Gdańsk). Germans and Dutch settled its valley beginning at the sea coast and gradually moving further south to the interior. Eventually, Prussia acquired most of the Vistula's watershed, and the central portion of then-Poland became South Prussia. Its existence was brief - 1793 to 1806, but by its end many German settlers had established Protestant agricultural settlements within its earlier borders. By contrast, most Polish were Roman Catholics. Some German Roman Catholics also entered the region from the southwest, especially the area of Prussian Silesia. The 1935 "Breyer Map" shows the distribution of German settlements in what became central Poland.

Napoleon's victories ended the short existence of South Prussia. The French Emperor incorporated that and other territories into the Duchy of Warsaw. After Napoleon's defeat in 1815, however, the Duchy was divided. Prussia annexed the western Posen region, and what is now central Poland became the Russian client-state known as Congress Poland. Many Germans continued to live in this central region, maintaining their middle-German Prussian dialect, similar to the Silesian dialect, and their Protestant and Catholic religions. (The Russian population was primarily Russian Orthodox, which was the established national church.) 

During World Wars I and II, the eastern front was fought over in this area. The Soviet government increased conscription of young men. The rate of Vistula Germans' migrations to this area from Congress Poland increased. Some became Polonized, however, and their descendants remain in Poland. 

During the last year and after World War II, many ethnic Germans fled or were forcibly expelled by the Russians and the Poles from Eastern Europe, particularly those who had maintained their German language and separate religions. The Russians and Poles blamed them for being allies of the Nazis and the reason that Nazi Germany had invaded the East in its program of lebensraum. The Germans were also held to have abused the native populations in internal warfare, allied with the Germans during their occupation. Under the Potsdam Agreement, major population transfers were agreed to by the allies. The deportees generally lost all their property and were often attacked during their deportations. Those who survived joined millions of other displaced peoples on the road after the war.

Volga Germans (Russia)

Czarina Catherine II was German, born in Stettin in Pomerania (now Szczecin in Poland). After gaining her power, she proclaimed open immigration for foreigners wishing to live in the Russian Empire on 22 July 1763, marking the beginning of a wave of German migration to the Empire. She wanted German farmers to redevelop farmland that had been fallow after conflict with the Ottomans. German colonies were founded in the lower Volga river area almost immediately afterward. These early colonies were attacked during the Pugachev uprising, which was centred on the Volga area, but they survived the rebellion.

German immigration was motivated in part by religious intolerance and warfare in central Europe, as well as by frequently difficult economic conditions, particularly among the southern principalities. Catherine II's declaration freed German immigrants from requirements for military service (which was imposed on native Russians) and from most taxes. It placed the new arrivals outside of Russia's feudal hierarchy and granted them considerable internal autonomy. Moving to Russia gave German immigrants political rights that they would not have possessed in their own lands. Religious minorities found these terms very agreeable, particularly Mennonites from the Vistula River valley. Their unwillingness to participate in military service, and their long tradition of dissent from mainstream Lutheranism and Calvinism, made life under the Prussians very difficult for them. Nearly all of the Prussian Mennonites emigrated to Russia over the following century, leaving no more than a handful in Prussia.

Other German minority churches took advantage of Catherine II's offer as well, particularly Evangelical Christians such as the Baptists. Although Catherine's declaration forbade them from proselytising among members of the Orthodox Church, they could evangelize Russia's Muslim and other non-Christian minorities.

German colonization was most intense in the Lower Volga, but other areas also received immigrants. Many settled in the area around the Black Sea, and the Mennonites favoured the lower Dnieper river area, around Ekaterinoslav (now Dnipro) and Aleksandrovsk (now Zaporizhia).

In 1803 Catherine II's grandson, Tsar Alexander I, reissued her proclamation. In the chaos of the Napoleonic wars, Germans responded in great number, fleeing their wartorn land. The Tsar's administration eventually imposed minimum financial requirements on new immigrants, requiring them to have either 300 gulden in cash or special skills in order to be accepted for entry to Russia.

The abolition of serfdom in the Russian Empire in 1863 created a shortage of labour in agriculture. The need for workers attracted new German immigration, particularly from the increasingly crowded central European states. There was no longer enough fertile land there for full employment in agriculture.

Furthermore, a sizable portion of Russia's ethnic Germans migrated into Russia from its Polish possessions. The 18th-century partitions of Poland (1772–1795) dismantled the Polish-Lithuanian state, dividing it between Austria, Prussia and Russia. Many Germans already living in those parts of Poland transferred to Russia, dating back to medieval and later migrations. Many Germans in Congress Poland migrated further east into Russia between then and World War I, particularly in the aftermath of the Polish insurrection of 1830. The Polish insurrection in 1863 added a new wave of German emigration from Poland to those who had already moved east, and led to the founding of extensive German colonies in Volhynia. When Poland reclaimed its independence in 1918 after World War I, it ceased to be a source of German emigration to Russia, but by then many hundreds of thousands of Germans had already settled in enclaves across the Russian Empire.

Germans settled in the Caucasus area from the beginning of the 19th century and in the 1850s expanded into the Crimea. In the 1890s new German colonies opened in the Altay mountain area in Russian Asia (see Mennonite settlements of Altai). German colonial areas continued to expand in Ukraine as late as the beginning of World War I.

According to the first census of the Russian Empire in 1897, about 1.8 million respondents reported German as their mother tongue.

Black Sea Germans (Moldova and Ukraine)

The Black Sea Germans - including the Bessarabian Germans and the Dobrujan Germans - settled the territories of the northern bank of the Black Sea in present-day Ukraine in the late 18th and the 19th century. Catherine the Great had gained this land for Russia through her two wars with the Ottoman Empire (1768–1774) and from the annexation of the Crimean Khanates (1783). 

The area of settlement did not develop as compact as that of the Volga territory, and a chain of ethnic German colonies resulted. The first German settlers arrived in 1787, first from West Prussia, followed by immigrants from Western and Southwestern Germany (including Roman Catholics), and from the Warsaw area. Also many Germans, beginning in 1803, immigrated from the northeastern area of Alsace west of the Rhine River. They settled roughly 30 miles northeast of Odessa (city) in Ukraine, forming several enclaves that quickly expanded, resulting in daughter colonies springing up nearby.

Crimea

From 1783 onward the Crown initiated a systematic settlement of Russians, Ukrainians, and Germans in the Crimean Peninsula (in what was then the Crimean Khanate) in order to dilute the native population of the Crimean Tatars.

In 1939, around 60,000 of the 1.1 million inhabitants of Crimea were ethnic German. Two years later, following the end of the alliance and the Nazi German invasion of the Soviet Union, the government deported ethnic Germans from the Crimea to Central Asia in the Soviet Union's program of population transfers. Conditions were harsh and many of the deportees died. It was not until the period of Perestroika in the late 1980s that the government granted surviving ethnic Germans and their descendants the right to return from Central Asia to the peninsula.

Volhynian Germans (Poland and Ukraine)

The migration of Germans into Volhynia ( covering northwestern Ukraine from a short distance west of Kiev to the border with Poland) occurred under significantly different conditions than those described above. By the end of the 19th century, Volhynia had more than 200,000 German settlers. Their migration began was encouraged by local noblemen, often Polish landlords, who wanted to develop their significant land-holdings in the area for agricultural use. Probably 75% or more of the Germans came from Congress Poland, with the balance coming directly from other regions such as East and West Prussia, Pomerania, Posen, Württemberg, and Galicia, among others. Although the noblemen offered certain incentives for the relocations, the Germans of Volhynia received none of the government's special tax and military service freedoms granted to Germans in other areas.

Shortly after 1800, the first German families started moving into the area. A surge occurred after the first Polish rebellion of 1831 but by 1850, Germans still numbered only about 5000. The largest migration came after the second Polish rebellion of 1863, and Germans began to flood into the area by the thousands. By 1900 they numbered about 200,000. The vast majority of these Germans were Protestant Lutherans (in Europe they were referred to as Evangelicals). Limited numbers of Mennonites from the lower Vistula River region settled in the south part of Volhynia. Baptists and Moravian Brethren settled mostly northwest of Zhitomir. Another major difference between the Germans here and in other parts of Russia is that the other Germans tended to settle in larger communities. The Germans in Volhynia were scattered about in over 1400 villages. Though the population peaked in 1900, many Germans had already begun leaving Volhynia in the late 1880s for North and South America.

Between 1911 and 1915, a small group of Volhynian German farmers (36 families - more than 200 people) chose to move to Eastern Siberia, making use of the resettlement subsidies of the government's Stolypin reform of 1906–1911. They settled in three villages (Pikhtinsk, Sredne-Pikhtinsk, and Dagnik) in what is today Zalarinsky District of Irkutsk Oblast, where they became known as the "Bug Hollanders". They apparently were not using the German language any more, but rather spoke Ukrainian and Polish. They used Lutheran Bibles that had been printed in East Prussia, in the Polish form known as fraktur. Their descendants, many with German surnames, continue to live in the district into the 21st century.

Caucasus Germans

A German minority of about 100,000 people existed in the Caucasus region, in areas such as the North Caucasus, Georgia, and Azerbaijan. In 1941 Joseph Stalin ordered all inhabitants with a German father to be deported, mostly to Siberia or Kazakhstan.

Mass emigration of Germans from Russia to the Americas 1870s to 1910s
The Germans from Russia who emigrated to different countries of the Americas at the end of the 19th century, unlike those who remained in the Russian Empire, were able to avoid Russification, preserving their ancestral German culture.

North America

Most of the people on the Great Plains of North America with German heritage had ancestors who emigrated from the Russian Empire, and not modern-day Germany.  The Canadian Encyclopedia states simply: "Canada's main source of Germans was Russia — especially from the Volga, the Black Sea coast and Volhynia."  The Encyclopedia of the Great Plains says that "[b]etween 1873 and 1914 approximately 115,000 German Russians immigrated to the United States and about 150,000 to western Canada" and "it is estimated[...] that by 1910 approximately 44 percent of all German settlers in western Canada were Germans from Russia".

South America

Brazil
By 1876 the Empire of Brazil, now Brazil, was a monarchy and Pedro II invited the Volga Germans and other Germans from Russia to populate his territory. From then on, waves of German immigrants settled in the states of São Paulo, Paraná, Santa Catarina and Río Grande do Sul.

Argentina
Germans from Russia, especially Volga Germans, founded many colonies in Argentina. Mainly in the South of Buenos Aires Province, Entre Ríos Province and La Pampa Province. These colonies maintain their culture to this day and organize different festivals (Kerb, Kreppelfest, Schlachtfest, etc.) in which they welcome the rest of the country's population. The total number of Volga German descendants in Argentina is estimated at more than 2,000,000 inhabitants.

Decline of the Russian Germans

The decline of the Russian German community started with the reforms of Alexander II. In 1871, he repealed the open-door immigration policy of his ancestors, effectively ending any new German immigration into the Empire. Although the German colonies continued to expand, they were driven by natural growth and by the immigration of Germans from Poland.

The Russian nationalism that took root under Alexander II served as a justification for eliminating in 1871 the bulk of the tax privileges enjoyed by Russian Germans, and after 1874 they were subjected to military service. Only after long negotiations, Mennonites, traditionally a pacifist denomination, were allowed to serve alternative service in the form of work in forestry and the medical corps. The resulting disaffection motivated many Russian Germans, especially members of traditionally dissenting Protestant churches, to migrate to the United States and Canada, while many Catholics chose Brazil and Argentina. They moved primarily to the American Great Plains and western Canada, especially North Dakota, South Dakota, Nebraska, Kansas, and Colorado; to Canada Manitoba and Saskatchewan, and Alberta; to Brazil, especially Paraná, Santa Catarina and Rio Grande do Sul; and to Argentina, especially South of Buenos Aires Province, Entre Ríos Province and La Pampa Province. North Dakota and South Dakota attracted primarily Odessa (Black Sea area) Germans from Russia while Nebraska and Kansas attracted mainly Volga Germans from Russia. The majority of Volhynia Germans chose Canada as their destination with significant numbers later migrating to the United States. Smaller settlement pockets also occurred in other regions such as Volga and Volhynian Germans in southwestern Michigan, Volhynian Germans in Wisconsin, and Congress Poland and Volhynian Germans in Connecticut.

After 1881, Russian Germans were required to study Russian in school and lost all their remaining special privileges. Many Germans remained in Russia, particularly those who had done well as Russia began to industrialise in the late 19th century. Russian Germans were disproportionately represented among Russia's engineers, technical tradesmen, industrialists, financiers and large land owners.

World War I was the first time Russia went to war against Germany since the Napoleonic era, and Russian Germans were quickly suspected of having enemy sympathies. The Germans living in the Volhynia area were deported to the German colonies in the lower Volga river in 1915 when Russia started losing the war. Many Russian Germans were exiled to Siberia by the Tsar's government as enemies of the state - generally without trial or evidence. In 1916, an order was issued to deport the Volga Germans to the east as well, but the Russian Revolution prevented this from being carried out.

The loyalties of Russian Germans during the revolution varied. While many supported the royalist forces and joined the White Army, others were committed to Alexander Kerensky's Provisional Government, to the Bolsheviks, and even to smaller forces like Nestor Makhno's. Russian Germans - including Mennonites and Evangelicals - fought on all sides in the Russian Revolution and Civil War. Although some Russian Germans were very wealthy, others were quite poor and sympathised strongly with their Slavic neighbours. Educated Russian Germans were just as likely to have leftist and revolutionary sympathies as the ethnically Russian intelligentsia.

In the chaos of the Russian Revolution and the civil war that followed it, many ethnic Germans were displaced within Russia or emigrated from Russia altogether. The chaos surrounding the Russian Civil War was devastating to many German communities, particularly to religious dissenters like the Mennonites. Many Mennonites hold the forces of Nestor Makhno in Ukraine particularly responsible for large-scale violence against their community.

This period was also one of regular food shortages, caused by famine and the lack of long-distance transportation of food during the fighting. Coupled with the typhus epidemic and famine of the early 1920s, as many as a third of Russia's Germans may have perished. Russian German organisations in the Americas, particularly the Mennonite Central Committee, organised famine relief in Russia in the late 1920s. As the chaos faded and the Soviet Union's position became more secure, many Russian Germans simply took advantage of the end of the fighting to emigrate to the Americas. Emigration from the Soviet Union came to a halt in 1929 by Stalin's decree, leaving roughly one million Russian Germans within Soviet borders.

The Soviet Union seized the farms and businesses of Russian Germans, along with all other farms and businesses, when Stalin ended Vladimir Lenin's New Economic Policy in 1929 and began the forced collectivization of agriculture and liquidation of large land holdings.

Nonetheless, Soviet nationalities policy had, to some degree, restored the institutions of Russian Germans in some areas. In July 1924, the Volga German Autonomous Soviet Socialist Republic was founded, giving the Volga Germans some autonomous German language institutions. The Lutheran church, like nearly all religious affiliations in Russia, was ruthlessly suppressed under Stalin. But, for the 600,000-odd Germans living in the Volga German ASSR, German was the language of local officials for the first time since 1881.

As a result of the German invasion of the Soviet Union on 22 June 1941, Stalin decided to deport the German Russians to internal exile and forced labor in Siberia and Central Asia. It is evident that, at this point, the regime considered national minorities with ethnic ties to foreign states, such as Germans, potential fifth columnists. On 12 August 1941, the Central Committee of the Communist Party decreed the expulsion of the Volga Germans, allegedly for treasonous activity, from their autonomous republic on the lower Volga. On 7 September 1941, the Volga German Autonomous Soviet Socialist Republic was abolished and about 438,000 Volga Germans were deported. In subsequent months, an additional 400,000 ethnic Germans were deported to Siberia from their other traditional settlements such as Ukraine and the Crimea.

The Soviets were not successful in deporting all German settlers living in the Western and Southern Ukraine, however, due to the rapid advance of the Wehrmacht (German Army from 1935 to 1945). The secret police, the NKVD, was able to deport only 35% of the ethnic Germans from Ukraine. Thus in 1943, the Nazi German census registered 313,000 ethnic Germans living in the occupied territories of the Soviet Union. With the Soviet re-conquest, the Wehrmacht evacuated about 300,000 German Russians and brought them back to the Reich. Because of the provisions of the Yalta Agreement, all former Soviet citizens living in Germany at war's end had to be repatriated, most by force. More than 200,000 German Russians were deported, against their will, by the Allies and sent to the Gulag. Thus, shortly after the end of the war, more than one million ethnic Germans from Russia were in special settlements and labor camps in Siberia and Central Asia. It is estimated that 200,000 to 300,000 died of starvation, lack of shelter, over-work, and disease during the 1940s.

On 26 November 1948, Stalin made the banishment permanent, declaring that Russia's Germans were permanently forbidden from returning to Europe, but this was rescinded after his death in 1953. Many Russian Germans returned to European Russia, but quite a few remained in Soviet Asia.

Although the post-Stalin Soviet state no longer persecuted ethnic Germans as a group, their Soviet republic was not re-founded. Many Germans in Russia largely assimilated and integrated into Russian society. There were some 2 million ethnic Germans in the Soviet Union in 1989. Soviet Union census revealed in 1989 that 49% of the German minority named German their mother tongue. According to the 1989 Soviet census, 957,518 citizens of German origin, or 6% of the total population, lived in
Kazakhstan, and 841,295 Germans lived in Russia including Siberia.

Perestroika opened the Soviet borders and witnessed the beginnings of a massive emigration of Germans from the Soviet Union. With the dissolution of the Soviet Union, large numbers of Russian Germans took advantage of Germany's liberal law of return to leave the harsh conditions of the Soviet successor states. The German population of Kyrgyzstan has practically disappeared, and Kazakhstan has lost well over half of its roughly one million Germans. The drop in the Russian Federation's German population was smaller but still significant. A very few Germans returned to one of their ancestral provinces: about 6,000 settled in Kaliningrad Oblast (former East Prussia).

Russian Germans and Perestroika

Since migrating to Russia in the eighteenth and nineteenth centuries, Germans had adopted many of the Slavic traits and cultures and formed a special group known as "rossiskie nemtsy", or Russian Germans. Recently, Russian Germans have become of national interest to Germany and to the Commonwealth of Independent States (CIS). Although ethnic Germans were no longer persecuted, their pre-Bolshevik lives and villages were not re-founded. Many Germans integrated into Soviet society where they now continue to live. The displaced Germans are unable to return to their ancestral lands in the Volga River Valley or the Black Sea regions, because in many instances, those villages no longer exist after being destroyed during Stalin's regime. In 1990, approximately 45,000 Russian Germans, or 6% of the population, lived in the former German Volga Republic. During the late twentieth century, three-quarters of Russian Germans were living in Central Asia (Kazakhstan, Kyrgyzstan, Tadzhikistan and Uzbekistan), South-West Siberia and Southern Urals.
 
Starting in the 1970s, a push-pull effect began that would influence where Russian Germans would eventually live. Because of a bad economy, tensions increased between autochthonous groups and recently settled ethnic minorities living in Central Asia. This strain worsened after the Afghanistan War began in 1979. Germans and other Europeans felt culturally and economically pressured to leave these countries, and moved to the Russian Republic. This migration continued into the 1990s.
 
During Perestroika in the 1980s, the Soviet borders were opened and the beginnings of a massive migration of Germans from the Soviet Union occurred. Entire families, and even villages, would leave their homes and relocate together in Germany or Austria. This was because they needed to show the German Embassy certain documents, such as a family Bible, as proof that their ancestors were originally from Germany. This meant if a family member stayed in the Soviet Union, but then decided to leave later, they would be unable to because they would no longer have the necessary paperwork. Also, Russian German villages were pretty much self-sustaining so if an individual that was necessary for that community, such as a teacher, mechanic or blacksmith left, then the entire village might disappear because it was hard to find a replacement for these vital community members.
 
Legal and economic pull factors contributed to Russian Germans decision to move to Germany. They were given special legal status of Aussiedler (exiles from former German territories or of German descent) which gave them instant German citizenship, the right to vote, unlimited work permit, the flight from Moscow to Frankfurt (with all of their personal belongings and household possessions), job training, and unemployment benefits for three years.

Russian Germans from South-West Siberia received a completely different treatment than the Germans living in Central Asia. Local authorities were persuading Germans to stay by creating two self-governing districts.

The All-Union Society Wiedergeburt (Renaissance) was founded in 1989 to encourage Russian Germans to move back to, and restore the Volga Republic. This plan was not successful because Germany interfered with the discussions and created diplomatic friction, which resulted in Russian opposition to this project. A couple of those problems were the two sides could not put aside their differences and agree on certain principles such as the meaning of the word "rehabilitation". They also neglected the economic reasons why Russia wanted to entice Russian Germans back to the Volga. In 1992, Russian Germans and Russian officials finally agreed on a plan, but Germany did not approve it.
 
On 21 February 1992, Boris Yeltsin, President of the Russian Federation, signed a German-Russian Federation agreement with Germany to restore citizenship to Russian Germans. This Federal Program intended to gradually restore the homeland of Russian Germans, and their descendants, in the former Republic of Volga, thus encouraging Russian Germans to immigrate back to Russia. It would also guarantee the national and cultural identity of Russian Germans would be preserved, such as their culture, language and religion. At the same time, it would not block or regulate their right to leave if they decide to do so at a later point. 
 
Events for a separate territory proceeded differently in Siberia, because financially stable Russian German settlements already existed. Siberian officials were economically driven to keep their skilled Russian German citizens and not see them leave for other republics or countries. In the late 1980s, 8.1% of Russian Germans lived in the county of Altay in South-West Siberia and they controlled one-third of profitable farms.

In early 1990, a few ideas offered to the Officer of Exiles (the bureau in charge of emigrants after arriving in Germany) in order to retain Russian Germans, or to promote their return included the suggestion that the necessary important village specialists (mechanics, teachers, doctors, etc.) should be offered incentives such as Trade Associations and additional training in order to keep, or to attract them to Russia. Russian German schools and universities should also be reopened. A third idea is to establish a financial institution that would motivate individuals to buy homes, and start farms or small businesses. Unfortunately, proposed initiatives have not gained traction and have not been instituted due to corruption, incompetency and inexperience. The Association for Germans Abroad (VDA) contracted with the business Inkoplan, to move families from Central Asia at vastly inflated costs. This resulted in VDA and Inkoplan personnel pocketing the difference. Examples of incompetency and inexperience included: VDA falsely projected the idea all Russian Germans wanted to leave their present homes and lives and move to the Volga region where they would start over. The Home Office was not fluent in the Russian language or familiar with foreign cultures abroad and this created many misunderstandings between various groups. Because of these actions by the Home Office, the migration back to Germany continues. Over 140,000 individuals migrated to Germany from CIS in 1990 and 1991, and almost 200,000 people migrated in 1992.

Demographics

In the 2010 Russian census, 394,138 Germans were enumerated, down from 597,212 in 2002, making Germans the 20th largest ethnic group in Russia. There are approximately 300,000 Germans living in Siberia. In addition, the same census found that there are 2.9 million citizens who understand the German language (although many of these are ethnic Russians or Yiddish-speaking Jews who had learned the language). Prominent ethnic Germans in modern Russia include Viktor Kress, governor of Tomsk Oblast from 1991 to 2002 and Herman Gref Minister of Economics and Trade of Russia from 2000 to 2007. Out of the 597,212 Germans enumerated in 2002, 68% lived in Asian federal districts and 32% lived in European federal districts. The Siberian Federal District, at 308,727 had the largest ethnic German population. But even in this federal district, they formed only 1.54% of the total population. The federal subjects with largest ethnic German populations were Altay Krai (79,502), Omsk Oblast (76,334), Novosibirsk (47,275), Kemerovo (35,965), Chelyabinsk (28,457), Tyumen (27,196), Sverdlovsk (22,540), Krasnodar (18,469), Orenburg (18,055), Volgograd (17,051), Tomsk (13,444), Saratov (12,093) and Perm Krai (10,152). Although emigration to Germany is no longer common, and some Germans move from Kazakhstan to Russia, the number of Germans in Russia continues to fall.

In 2011, the Kaluga Oblast included ethnic Germans living in the former republics of USSR, under the federal program for the return of compatriots to Russia.

According to the 1989 census there were 100,309 Germans living in Kyrgyzstan. According to the most recent census data (1999), there were 21,472 Germans in Kyrgyzstan. The German population in Tajikistan was 38,853 in 1979.

In Germany, there are an estimated 2.3 million German Russians, who have established one of the largest Russian-speaking communities outside of the former Soviet Union along with Israel's.

Education
Several German international schools for expatriates living in the former Soviet Union are in operation.

Russia:
 German International School Moscow
 German International School St. Petersburg

Georgia:
 German International School Tiflis

Ukraine:
 German International School Kyiv

Germans in the Baltics

The German presence on the eastern shores of the Baltic Sea dates back to the Middle Ages when traders and missionaries started arriving from central Europe. The German-speaking Livonian Brothers of the Sword conquered most of the Old Livonia (what is now Estonia and Latvia) in the early 13th century. In 1237, the Brothers of the Sword were incorporated into the Teutonic Knights.

During Peter the Great's rule, the Russian Empire gained control over most of Latvia and Estonia from Sweden in the Great Northern War (1700–1721), but left the local German nobility in control. Until the Russification policies of the 1880s, the Baltic German community and its institutions were intact and protected under the Russian Empire. The Baltic German nobility were very influential in the Russian Tsar's army and administration.

The reforms of Alexander III replaced many of the traditional privileges of the German nobility with elected local governments and more uniform tax codes. Schools were required to teach Russian, and the Russian nationalist press began targeting segregated Germans as unpatriotic and "insufficiently Russian". Baltic Germans also became the target of emerging Latvian and Estonian nationalist movements.

In late 1939 (after the start of World War II), the majority of the Baltic German community in Latvia and Estonia answered the call of the Führer Adolf Hitler and "repatriated" to the areas that Nazi Germany had conquered a few weeks before in western Poland (especially in the Warthegau). The "legal basis" for this had been agreed in the August 1939 Nazi–Soviet Pact's secret clauses (the "German–Soviet Boundary and Friendship Treaty"). Smaller scale "repatriation"  of ethnic Germans (and their family members) continued after Stalin's Soviet Union had invaded and occupied Latvia and Estonia in 1940–1941. Only a few hundred Baltic Germans remained under the Soviet rule after 1945, mainly among those few who had refused Hitler's call to leave for Germany.

Notable Russian Germans

 Rudolf Abel (1903–1971), Soviet intelligence officer
 Nikolay Bauman (1873–1905), Russian revolutionary of the Bolshevik Party
 Alexandra Feodorovna (Alix of Hesse) (1872–1918), Empress Consort of Russia
 Georgy Boos (born 1963), governor of Kaliningrad Oblast, 2005 to 2010.
 Catherine the Great (1729–1796), Empress of Russia
 Nikolai Erdmann (1900–1970), dramatist 
 Helene Fischer (born 1984), singer, dancer, entertainer, TV presenter and actress.
 Alisa Freindlich (born 1934) actress
 Jeanna Friske  (1974–2015), singer, model, actress, socialite
 Andrei Geim (Andre Geim) (born 1958), Physics Nobel Laureate for his work on graphene
 Anna German (Anna Hörmann) (1936–1982), singer 
 Edgar Gess (born 1954), football player & coach
 Reinhold Glière (Reinhold Ernst Glier) (1875–1956), composer 
 Hermann Gräf (born 1964), Minister of Economics and Trade
 Angelina Grün (born 1979) volleyball player
 Gustav Klinger (1876–1937), communist politician 
 Olga Knipper-Chekhova (1868–1959), actress, wife of Anton Chekhov 
 Alfred Koch (born 1961), statesman, writer, mathematician, economist and businessman
 Wladimir Köppen (1846–1940), meteorologist, climatologist and botanist
 Viktor Kress (born 1948) governor of Tomsk Oblast, 1991 to 2012.
 Vladimir Lenin (1870–1924), Soviet Chairman of Soviet Union
 Andreas Maurer (born 1970), local politician 
 Alexander Merkel (born 1992), football player 
 Vsevolod Meyerhold (Karl Kasimir Theodor Meyerhold), (1874–1940), actor & theatre director 
 Irina Mikitenko (born 1972), long-distance runner
 Alexei Miller (born 1962), Gazprom CEO
 Karl Nesselrode (1780–1862), count and diplomat 
 Peter Neustädter (born 1966), football player and manager
 Vladimir Pachmann (1848–1933), pianist 
 Pavel Pestel (1793–1826) one of the Decembrist leaders
 Vyacheslav von Plehve (Vyacheslav Pleve) (1846–1904), Minister of the Interior
 Boris Rauschenbach (1915–2001), physicist and engineer 
 Sviatoslav Richter (1915–1997), pianist 
 Patriarch Alexy II (Alexey Ridiger) (1929–2008), primate of the Russian Orthodox Church 
 Nicholas Roerich (1874–1947), painter
 Eduard Rossel (born 1937), governor of Sverdlovsk Oblast, 1995–2009
 Otto Schmidt (1891–1956), geophysicist and statesman 
 Pyotr Schmidt (1867–1906), Russian naval officer and 1905 revolutionary 
 Alfred Schnittke (1934–1998), composer 
 Dennis Siver (born 1979), mixed martial arts fighter
 Jordin Sparks (born 1989), singer and actress
 Vasiliy Ulrikh (Vasiliy Ulrich) (1889–1951), Soviet political judge 
 Maria Alexandrovna Ulyanova (1835–1916), mother of Vladimir Lenin 
 Max Vasmer (1886–1962), wrote the Etymological dictionary of the Russian language 
 Brad Wall (born 1965), Premier of Saskatchewan, 2007 to 2018.
 Lawrence Welk (1903–1992), an accordionist, bandleader and TV impresario
 Immanuel Winkler (1886–1932) – Pastor, official representative of Black Seas Germans
 Sergei Witte (1849–1915), the first Prime Minister of Russia Empire 
 Peter Wittgenstein, (1769–1843), Field Marshal in the Imperial Russian Army
 Andreas Wolf (born 1982), football player 
 Dennis Wolf (born 1978), bodybuilder
 Zedd (born 1989), stage name of Anton Zaslavski, record producer, DJ, musician & songwriter.

See also

 Bessarabia Germans
 Crimean Goths
 Deutsche Nationalkreis Asowo
 Deutsche Nationalkreis Halbstadt
 Germans of Kazakhstan
 German operation of the NKVD
 House of Holstein-Gottorp-Romanov
 Mennonite settlements of Altai
 Molotov–Ribbentrop Pact
 Nazi–Soviet population transfers
 Population transfer in the Soviet Union
 Russians in Germany
 Russian Mennonite
 Volga German Autonomous Soviet Socialist Republic

Notes

External links
 Black Sea German Research
 Germans From Russia Heritage Society
 American Historical Society of Germans from Russia
 German-Russian Settlement Map
 Manifesto of the Empress Catherine II issued July 22, 1763
 Vistula Germans - history and map settlements by religion
 Germans from Volhynia - genealogy, culture, history
 JewishGen's Gazetteer

 
German
German
Russian German
German diaspora in Europe
Volga German people